Mirror, Mirror is a 2022 Spanish comedy film directed and written by Marc Crehuet which stars Santi Millán, Malena Alterio, Carlos Areces and Natalia de Molina.

Plot 
The fiction follows four employees working for a cosmetics company who engage in conversations with their reflections on the mirror.

Cast

Production 
The screenplay was written by the director . Produced by Rodar y Rodar and Nos gusta el cine AIE, with the participation of RTVE, TV3 and Netflix, shooting began on 10 August 2020 and wrapped by September 2020. Shooting locations included Pamplona and Barcelona.

Release 
The film premiered as the opening film of the 6th  on 21 April 2022. Distributed by Filmax, it was theatrically released in Spain on 20 May 2022.

See also 
 List of Spanish films of 2022

References

External links
 

2022 comedy films
Spanish comedy films
2020s Spanish-language films
Films shot in Barcelona
Films shot in Navarre
Rodar y Rodar films
Filmax films
2020s Spanish films